Tab Hunter (born Arthur Andrew Kelm; July 11, 1931 – July 8, 2018) was an American actor, singer, film producer, and author. Known for his blond, clean-cut good looks, Hunter starred in more than forty films. He was a Hollywood heartthrob of the 1950s and 1960s appearing on the covers of hundreds of film magazines. Hunter's film credits include Battle Cry (1955), The Girl He Left Behind (1956), Gunman's Walk (1958), and Damn Yankees (1958). Hunter also had a music career in the late 1950s; in 1957, he released a number one hit single "Young Love". Hunter's 2005 autobiography, Tab Hunter Confidential: The Making of a Movie Star, was a New York Times bestseller.

Early life
Arthur Andrew Kelm was born in Manhattan, New York City, the son of Gertrude and Charles Kelm. Kelm's father was Jewish, and his mother was a Catholic German immigrant from Hamburg. He had an older brother, Walter. Kelm's father was reportedly abusive, and within a few years of his birth, his parents divorced. He was raised in California, living with his mother, his brother, and his maternal grandparents, John Henry and Ida (née Sonnenfleth) Gelien; the family resided in San Francisco, Long Beach and Los Angeles. His mother re-assumed her maiden surname, Gelien, and changed her sons' surnames as well. As a teenager, Arthur Gelien (as he was then known) was a figure skater, competing in both singles and pairs. Gelien was sent to Catholic school by his religious mother.

Gelien joined the United States Coast Guard at age fifteen, lying about his age to enlist. While in the Coast Guard, he gained the nickname "Hollywood" for his penchant for watching movies rather than going to bars while on liberty. When his superiors discovered his true age, they discharged him. Gelien met actor Dick Clayton socially; Clayton suggested that he become an actor.

Career

1950s
Dick Clayton introduced Gelien to agent Henry Willson, who specialized in representing beefcake male stars such as Robert Wagner and Rock Hudson. It was Willson who named him "Tab Hunter".

Hunter's first film role was a minor part in a film noir, The Lawless (1950). Hunter was a friend of character actor Paul Guilfoyle, who suggested him to director Stuart Heisler; Heisler was looking for an unknown to play the lead in Island of Desire (1952) opposite Linda Darnell. The film, essentially a two-hander between Hunter and Darnell, was a hit.

Hunter supported George Montgomery in Gun Belt (1953), a Western produced by Edward Small. Small used him again for a war film, The Steel Lady (1953), supporting Rod Cameron, and as the lead in an adventure tale, Return to Treasure Island (1954). He began acting on stage, appearing in a production of Our Town. Hunter was then offered, and accepted, a contract at Warner Bros.

One of Hunter's first films for Warner Bros. was The Sea Chase (1955), supporting John Wayne and Lana Turner. It was a big hit, but Hunter's part was relatively small. Rushes were seen by William A. Wellman, who cast Hunter to play the younger brother of Robert Mitchum in Track of the Cat (1954). It was a solid hit and Hunter began to get more notice.

His breakthrough role came when he was cast as the young Marine Danny in 1955's World War II drama Battle Cry, which was the year's third most financially successful film. His character has an affair with an older woman, but ends up marrying the girl next door. It was based on a bestseller by Leon Uris and became Warner Bros.' largest grossing film that year, cementing Hunter's position as one of Hollywood's top young romantic leads.

In September 1955, the tabloid magazine Confidential reported that Hunter had been arrested for disorderly conduct in 1950. The innuendo-laced article, and a second one focusing on Rory Calhoun's prison record, were the result of a deal Henry Willson had brokered with the scandal rag in exchange for not revealing to the public the sexual orientation of his more prominent client, Rock Hudson. The report had no negative effect on Hunter's career. A few months later, he was named Most Promising New Personality in a nationwide poll sponsored by the Council of Motion Picture Organizations. In 1956, he received 62,000 valentines. Hunter, James Dean, and Natalie Wood were the last actors to be placed under an exclusive studio contract at Warner Bros. Warner decided to promote him to star status, teaming him with Natalie Wood in two films, a Western, The Burning Hills (1956), directed by Heisler, and The Girl He Left Behind (1956), a service comedy. These films also proved to be a hit with audiences. Warners planned a third teaming of Hunter and Wood but Hunter rejected the third picture, thus ending Warners' attempt to make Hunter and Wood the William Powell and Myrna Loy of the 1950s. Hunter was Warner Bros.' most popular male star from 1955 until 1959.

Hunter received strong critical acclaim for a television performance he gave in the debut episode of Playhouse 90 ("Forbidden Area", 1956) written by Rod Serling and directed by John Frankenheimer.

Hunter's acting career was at its peak. William Wellman used him again in a war film, Lafayette Escadrille (1958). Columbia Pictures borrowed him for a Western, Gunman's Walk (1958). Hunter claimed, "When Gunman's Walk premiered the following summer, it was one of the proudest moments of my career." Hunter starred in the musical film Damn Yankees (1958), in which he played Joe Hardy of Washington, D.C.'s American League baseball club. The film had originally been a Broadway musical, but Hunter was the only one in the film version who had not appeared in the original cast. The show was based on the best-selling 1954 book The Year the Yankees Lost the Pennant by Douglass Wallop. Hunter later said the filming was hellish because director George Abbott was interested only in recreating the stage version word for word. He also had a supporting role in the western They Came to Cordura (1959) (with Gary Cooper and Rita Hayworth) and starred in the romantic drama That Kind of Woman (1959) (with Sophia Loren).

Music career

Hunter had a 1957 hit record with the song "Young Love," which was No. 1 on the Billboard Hot 100 chart for six weeks (seven weeks on the UK Chart), and became one of the larger hits of the Rock 'n' Roll era. It sold more than two million copies, and was awarded a gold disc by the RIAA.

Hunter had another hit single, "Ninety-Nine Ways", which peaked at No. 11 in the United States and No. 5 in the United Kingdom. His success prompted Jack L. Warner to enforce the actor's contract with the Warner Bros. studio by banning Dot Records, the label for which Hunter had recorded the single (and which was owned by rival Paramount Pictures), from releasing a follow-up album he had recorded for them. He established Warner Bros. Records specifically for Hunter.

1960s

Hunter's failure to win the role of Tony in the film adaptation of West Side Story (1961) prompted him to agree to star in a weekly television sitcom. The Tab Hunter Show had moderate ratings (due to being scheduled opposite The Ed Sullivan Show) and lasted for one season (1960–61) of 32 episodes. It was a hit in the United Kingdom, where it ranked as one of the most watched situation comedies of the year. Hunter's costars in the series included Richard Erdman, Jerome Cowan, and Reta Shaw.

Hunter had a starring role as Debbie Reynolds' love interest in the romantic comedy The Pleasure of His Company (1961). He played the lead in an Italian swashbuckler shot in Egypt, The Golden Arrow (1962), but the film was a major box office flop. He was in a war movie for American International Pictures, Operation Bikini (1963), which drew mixed reviews.

In 1964, he starred on Broadway opposite Tallulah Bankhead in Tennessee Williams' The Milk Train Doesn't Stop Here Anymore. The play was a failure.

He had a supporting role in Ride the Wild Surf (1964), a surf film for Columbia, followed by a movie in Britain, the crime drama Troubled Waters (1964). He stayed in England to make another picture for AIP, the science fiction film War Gods of the Deep (1965) starring Vincent Price. Back in Hollywood, he had a supporting role in the comedies The Loved One (1965) and Birds Do It (1966). He starred in a film directed by Richard Rush, the low budget comedy The Fickle Finger of Fate (1967).

For a short time in the late 1960s, after several seasons of starring in summer stock and dinner theater in shows such as Bye Bye Birdie, The Tender Trap, Under the Yum Yum Tree, and West Side Story with some of the New York cast, Hunter settled in the south of France and acted in some Italian films including Vengeance Is My Forgiveness (1968), The Last Chance (1968), and Bridge over the Elbe (1969).

1970s
Hunter had the lead role in the psychological horror film Sweet Kill (1973), the first movie from director Curtis Hanson. His performance earned good reviews, but the film was a failure. He won a co-starring role in the successful western film The Life and Times of Judge Roy Bean (1972), starring Paul Newman. He had small roles in Timber Tramps (1975), Won Ton Ton, the Dog Who Saved Hollywood (1976) and Katie: Portrait of a Centerfold (1978). In 1977 he played George Shumway, the father of Mary Hartman (played by Louise Lasser) on Forever Fernwood, a spinoff of the soap-like sitcom Mary Hartman, Mary Hartman.

1980s
Hunter's career was revived in the 1980s, when he starred opposite actor Divine in John Waters' Polyester (1981) and Paul Bartel's Lust in the Dust (1985). He played Mr. Stuart, the substitute teacher in the musical Grease 2 (1982), who sang "Reproduction". Hunter had a major role in the horror film Cameron's Closet (1989).

Later career
Hunter's last film role came in the horse-themed family film Dark Horse (1992). Hunter, a longstanding horse owner, wrote the original story and co-produced the film with his life partner, Allan Glaser.

Hunter's autobiography, Tab Hunter Confidential: The Making of a Movie Star (2005), co-written with Eddie Muller, became a New York Times bestseller, as did the paperback edition in 2007. In his memoir, Hunter officially came out as gay, confirming rumors that had circulated since the height of his fame. The book was nominated for several awards. It entered the New York Times bestseller list for a third time on June 28, 2015, upon the release of Tab Hunter Confidential, an award-winning documentary based upon the memoir. The documentary was directed by Jeffrey Schwarz and produced by Allan Glaser. As of June 2018, a feature film about Hunter to be produced by Glaser, J. J. Abrams and Zachary Quinto was in development at Paramount Pictures. Pulitzer Prize- and Tony Award-winning writer Doug Wright is attached to create the screenplay.

Hunter has a star for his contributions to the music industry on the Hollywood Walk of Fame at 6320 Hollywood Blvd. In 2007, the Palm Springs Walk of Stars dedicated a Golden Palm Star to him.

Personal life
Hunter came out publicly as a gay man in his 2005 memoir. According to William L. Hamilton of The New York Times, detailed reports about Hunter's alleged romances with close friends Debbie Reynolds and Natalie Wood during his young adult years had strictly been the fodder of studio publicity departments. As Wood and Hunter embarked on a well-publicized but fictitious romance, insiders had developed their own headline for the item: "Natalie Wood and Tab Wouldn't". Regarding Hollywood's studio era, Hunter said, "[life] was difficult for me, because I was living two lives at that time. A private life of my own, which I never discussed, never talked about to anyone. And then my Hollywood life, which was just trying to learn my craft and succeed..." The star emphasized that the word gay' ... wasn't even around in those days, and if anyone ever confronted me with it, I'd just kinda freak out. I was in total denial. I was just not comfortable in that Hollywood scene, other than the work process." "There was a lot written about my sexuality, and the press was pretty darn cruel," the actor said, but what "moviegoers wanted to hold in their hearts were the boy-next-door marines, cowboys, and swoon-bait sweethearts I portrayed."

Hunter had a long-term relationship with actor Anthony Perkins after having met him at the Chateau Marmont during the filming of Friendly Persuasion in 1956. Their relationship spanned two to four years, and Hunter has said that they only broke up because of Perkins's movie studio, Paramount, and the studio system. However, he remembered Perkins as a "special part of my journey. He wanted to be a movie star more than anything. I wanted that too, but not with the same kind of drive he had. We were such opposites - but then maybe that was the attraction." He also had a relationship with champion figure skater Ronnie Robertson before settling down and marrying his partner/spouse of more than 35 years, film producer Allan Glaser. 

Hunter was raised in his mother's Catholic faith. Except for a period in his youth, Hunter was a practicing Catholic for the rest of his life. When asked about his Jewish identity, due to his father and partner/spouse being Jewish, Hunter stated that he did not identify as Jewish. Hunter was an avid horse owner.

Hunter's brother Walter Gelien, who was killed in Vietnam on October 28, 1965, was survived by his wife and seven children.

Death
On July 8, 2018, three days shy of his 87th birthday, Hunter died after suffering cardiac arrest that arose from complications related to deep vein thrombosis. According to his husband Allan Glaser, Hunter's death was "sudden and unexpected."

Filmography

Television

Discography

Notes

References

External links

 
 
 
 
 Half-Hour TV Interview via Vimeo.com
 Tab Hunter at Find a Grave

1931 births
2018 deaths
20th-century American male actors
20th-century American singers
21st-century American male actors
American male film actors
American male stage actors
American male television actors
American people of German descent
American people of Jewish descent
Burials at Santa Barbara Cemetery
California Republicans
Catholics from California
Catholics from New York (state)
Deaths from thrombosis
Dot Records artists
American gay actors
American gay musicians
American gay writers
LGBT people from New York (state)
LGBT Roman Catholics
American LGBT singers
Male actors from New York City
New York (state) Republicans
Warner Bros. contract players
Warner Records artists
20th-century American male singers
20th-century American LGBT people
21st-century American LGBT people